Earl Eugene Huckleberry (May 23, 1910 – February 25, 1999) was a pitcher in Major League Baseball. He played for the Philadelphia Athletics in 1935.  Huckleberry's lone appearance in the major leagues came on September 13, 1935, in a game in which he started on the mound against the Chicago White Sox.  After giving up a run in his first inning as a big leaguer, Huckleberry's team scored 8 runs for him in the bottom of the first, and he'd earn a win in his lone MLB appearance, a game in which his team won 19–7.

References

External links

1910 births
1999 deaths
Major League Baseball pitchers
Philadelphia Athletics players
Baseball players from Oklahoma
People from Konawa, Oklahoma